Runaway is a 1984 American science fiction action film written and directed by Michael Crichton, starring Tom Selleck, Gene Simmons, Cynthia Rhodes and Kirstie Alley. Selleck portrays a police officer assigned to track down dangerous robots, while Simmons is a scientist who hopes to profit from his manipulation of robots. The film was a box office disappointment and received mixed reviews.

Plot

In the near future, robots are commonplacea part of everyday life like any other electrical applianceand are just as prone to malfunctions. When a robot malfunctions, it could pose a threat to people or property. Such robots are known as "runaways". Since they are more dangerous than the average machine, they are handled by a division of the police trained in robotics. The "runaway" squad, however, is treated as an easy and unexciting assignment, and often ridiculed.

Sgt. Jack R. Ramsay is a veteran police officer who joined the runaway squad after an incident in which his fear of heights allowed a criminal to escape, which subsequently resulted in a family's death at the hands of that escaped criminal. After years on the job, Ramsay has found himself one of the division's few real experts. His new partner Karen Thompson is enthusiastic about the job, but he assures her there is little excitement involved, saying that mostly it involves flipping a switch. This changes when they find themselves handling a new threatthe first robotic homicide. Investigating a household robot that murdered a family with a kitchen knife and handgun, Jack discovers strange integrated circuits, which not only override a robot's safety features but also direct it to attack humans. These circuits are not hacked chips, but created from a series of master templates, enabling them to be mass-produced.

Despite being unable to learn anything from uncooperative informants who end up dead, Ramsay refuses to give up and soon discovers the perpetrator is sociopathic genius Dr. Charles Luther. Luther, while working for a defense contractor, developed a program that allows a robot to thermographically identify a human from amidst cover and to even differentiate between humans. Seeing the profit potential, he killed his fellow researchers and tried to sell the technology on the black market. A failed attempt to arrest Luthercomplicated by Ramsay having to remove an explosive shell from Thompson's armresults in the recovery of another of Luther's weapons, a smart bullet: a miniature heat seeking missile capable of locking onto a human target's unique heat signature, pursuing them wherever they run, even around corners.

While investigating another of Luther's partners, Ramsay and Thompson find Jackie Rogers, who was once Luther's lover. She double-crossed him and stole the circuit templates, intending to sell them herself. She is scared because she believes Luther will stop at nothing to kill her. When they create a ruse to transfer Jackie to safety, Luther attacks the police convoy with robotic smart bombs. They discover that the bombs are zeroing in on a bug in Jackie's purse; they throw the bag out the window before a bomb reaches the car.

Ramsay decides to make a public appearance with Jackie at a restaurant to draw Luther out, but instead Luther captures Thompson and wants Ramsay to exchange her for Jackie and the templates. Before making the exchange, Jackie gives some of the templates to Ramsay, for insurance that Luther won't kill her. But Luther kills her anyway, after discovering the templates missing. He then fires his smart bullets into the crowded restaurant and flees.

To retrieve the missing templates, Luther plans to attack Ramsay. He uses the police computers to discover everything about Ramsay's personal life, including his son. Once Ramsay discovers his information has been hacked, he races home to find his household robot damaged and his son Bobby missing. Luther calls to confirm he kidnapped Bobby and wants to exchange him for the missing templates.

Ramsay agrees to meet Luther at an unfinished skyscraper. Luther gets the templates while in exchange Ramsay sends his son down in an elevator whereupon Luther informs him that a legion of "assassin" robotssmall, spider-like robots which kill by injecting their victims with acidare waiting to kill the first person exiting the elevator. Thompson arrives and helps Bobby stay out of reach of the robots. Furious, Luther begins firing smart bullets, but Ramsay turns on the robotic construction equipment, creating multiple heat sources which cause the bullets to miss. Ramsay escapes and jumps on the elevator to go down. However, the elevator malfunctions, and speeds up to the very top and stops. Ramsay is forced to overcome his fear of heights by reaching a reset button underneath the elevator to restart it, while encountering three robot spiders. Ramsay defeats the three spiders and restarts the elevator downward. The elevator then stops on the floor Luther is on, with Luther approaching an already exhausted Ramsay in the elevator and insults Ramsay about his experience up top, causing Ramsay to start the elevator down again. During the descent, Ramsay and Luther fight, but Ramsay gains the upper hand by stopping the elevator. The abrupt stop catapults Luther onto the ground, in the midst of his robot spiders. Programmed to kill whoever came down, the robots rush Luther, injecting him several times.

Ramsay helps his son down and then cautiously approaches the motionless villain. Screaming, Luther reaches up to grab Ramsay, but falls back, dead, while the spiders self-destruct around him. Ramsay and Thompson share a passionate kiss.

Cast

Production
The film was written and directed by Michael Crichton who said he deliberately made it vague how far into the future the film was set. "If you want my world view, I think it's about a year ahead," he said.

Crichton said the film "is not a cautionary tale" about technology but "an updated police story with every police cliche turned a bit. This is a movie, at least in part, about the difference between people and machines. We tried very hard to keep perspective. Machines are so visually interesting that a lot of times they threaten to take over a film."

Crichton wanted to ensure the film was visual and easy to follow. "Movies are about the here and now in things you see. To me, there's no point in writing a highly cinematic book or doing a very literary movie."

The star was Tom Selleck who had had a small role in Crichton's film Coma and since became a star on TV in Magnum, P.I.. Selleck later said, "With my TV series, I don't have the luxury of taking on a lot of projects. So when I got offered a movie and the timing's right, I say yes. I keep thinking if I don't say yes, then everyone will go away. And being a fan of Michael Crichton's helped, because I'm really very nervous doing this. I need my confidence built as much as anybody. It's a strange business. I like to grow in my parts, this was a risk in some ways."

The film marked the first feature acting role for rock star Gene Simmons (he had been in Kiss Meets the Phantom of the Park). Simmons had been interested in acting for a while, and had studied it since 1981. He turned down a TV series which wanted to exploit his KISS fame as well as parts in Flashdance and Dr. Detroit because he "wasn't interested in musicals or comedy. I wanted to start out in something serious. I understand brooding characters more than I do splashy people." He was offered the part after meeting Crichton and did not have to read for it.

"I didn't see Luther as evil", Simmons said, "but as a deadly animal who kills when someone gets in his way. Crichton didn't want me to memorize the script or talk to my acting coach. His direction was, 'Don't be afraid to try different things.' "

Filming took place from 29 May to August 1984 in Vancouver while Selleck was on a break from Magnum, P.I..

Mercury Topazes were used for the police cruisers in the film

Jerry Goldsmith composed the original musical score, which was the composer's first all-electronic soundtrack.

Reception
With a multi-million dollar budget, big-name actors and a world-famous author as both writer and director, Runaway was planned as 1984's major science fiction draw. However, it was overshadowed by James Cameron's blockbuster The Terminator, Star Trek III: The Search for Spock, and 2010: The Year We Make Contact, and the film was a box office disappointment.

Critical response
The film received mixed reviews. Janet Maslin of The New York Times said, "Mr. Crichton has a much better feel for the gadgets than its human players." Kevin Thomas of The Los Angeles Times called it "assured, thoroughly cinematic filmmaking, its flourish of ingenious gadgetry not overwhelming its human dimension." Gene Siskel of The Chicago Tribune thought the movie began "excitingly" but "descended into a routine chase thriller" in which Selleck was a poor lead ("he's too nice, too familiar to be a big star in the movies"). At the Movies gave Runaway two thumbs down. Roger Ebert thought that Selleck and Simmons gave "good performances" but the film quickly became mired in cliches, while Gene Siskel thought the core premise was intriguing but the film was poorly executed.

Neil Gaiman reviewed Runaway for Imagine magazine, and stated that "The race to outwit the cybernetic psycho is gripping stuff, mostly, with a terrifying showdown atop an unfinished skyscraper; and as the hero cop with no head for heights, Selleck is fine. In between, he spends too much time just being a heart-throb."

On Rotten Tomatoes, it has a rating of 48% based on reviews from 23 critics.

Kirstie Alley earned a 1984 Saturn Award nomination for Best Supporting Actress for her performance.

See also
 List of American films of 1984
 The Phantom Creeps

References

External links
 
 
 
 
 
 
 Appreciation of film at Den of Geek

1984 films
1980s science fiction action films
American robot films
American science fiction action films
Films directed by Michael Crichton
Films with screenplays by Michael Crichton
TriStar Pictures films
Films scored by Jerry Goldsmith
Films shot in Vancouver
Mad scientist films
1980s English-language films
1980s American films